Rob Mercuri (born c. 1982) is an American politician. He has served as a member of the Pennsylvania House of Representatives since 2021, representing District 28.

Early life and career
Mercuri was raised in West Deer Township, and attended Deer Lake High School, graduating in 2000. He subsequently graduated from the United States Military Academy in 2004 and was deployed to Iraq. Upon completing his military service, Mercuri enrolled in night classes offered by the University of Massachusetts Amherst and worked for two accounting firms in New York City. He returned to Pennsylvania when hired by PNC Financial Services. With his wife Kelsey, Mercuri owns a small business located in Wexford.

Political career
After incumbent representative Mike Turzai of House District 28 announced that he was not running for reelection in 2020, Mercuri won a Republican Party primary against Michael Heckmann and Libby Blackburn, with Turzai's endorsement. Mercuri defeated Emily Skopov in the 2020 general election.

Committee assignments 

 Commerce, Secretary
 Education
 Finance
 Urban Affairs

References

1980s births
Living people
United States Military Academy alumni
21st-century American politicians
Pennsylvania Republicans

People from West Deer Township, Pennsylvania
Military personnel from Pennsylvania